Presidential elections were held in Madagascar on 30 January 1972. Incumbent President Philibert Tsiranana of the Social Democratic Party was the only candidate, and won the approval of 99.7% of voters. However, public unrest led to him handing over power to General Gabriel Ramanantsoa. Ramanantsoa put forward proposals for a five-year transition period during which the National Assembly would be suspended. The plans were approved in a referendum later in the year.

Results

References

Presidential elections in Madagascar
1972 in Madagascar
Madagascar
One-party elections
Single-candidate elections
January 1972 events in Africa
Election and referendum articles with incomplete results